The Heaton Lodge and Wortley Railway was constructed by the London and North Western Railway, to provide a duplicate route between  and , leaving the existing line at Heaton Lodge junction, east of Huddersfield and rejoining it at Farnley junction, south west of Leeds. During construction it became known as the Leeds New Line and following nationalisation it was referred to as the Spen Line. Passenger services ceased in the 1950s with full closure in stages between 1960 and 1990.

History
An early casualty of the construction of the railway was Mirfield Cricket Club, who stated in the Report and Balance sheet of the Annual General Meeting held at the Black Bull Hotel on Wednesday 18 December 1895:

The line was opened on 1 October 1900.

Route

Leaving the existing LNWR Huddersfield to Leeds line at Heaton Lodge junction, the line curved north, crossing the River Calder and Huddersfield Road on overbridges, to where  was reached. The line then crossed Mirfield viaduct before entering a cutting crossed by a series of road overbridges. This station burnt down in 1921 and was replaced by a new station south of the overbridge. The line then ran parallel to the Lancashire and Yorkshire Railway Mirfield Branch, crossing it and the Lancashire and Yorkshire Railway Ravensthorpe Branch before entering Heckmondwike in a series of cuttings and a short tunnel.  was itself in a cutting and was followed by a section of walled cutting with many overbridges, before passing through another cutting and reaching . The line then began a gentle curve to the east, passing through  before reaching  shortly after exiting Gomersal Tunnel. The line then passed through  and Gildersome Tunnel before reaching .

Spen Valley Ringway
In 2007 the Spen Valley Ringway was a  greenway route linking two schools at Littletown and Millbridge. In 2010 it was extended along  of the old Leeds New Line into Heckmondwike. This was part of a diversion of the Spen Valley Greenway whilst it was closed for water main construction and was financed by Yorkshire Water.

References

Closed railway lines in Yorkshire and the Humber
London and North Western Railway
Disused railway stations in Kirklees